Iota Arietis, Latinized from ι Arietis, is the Bayer designation for a binary star system in the northern constellation of Aries. It has an apparent visual magnitude of 5.117; bright enough to be dimly seen with the naked eye. The variable radial velocity of this system was announced by W. W. Campbell in 1922.

For the visible component, in 1952 N. G. Roman found a stellar classification of K1p, where the 'p' indicates some type of peculiarity with the spectrum. Her comments indicated that the "Hydrogen lines and λ 4290 are strong enough to indicate a class II star, but the CN is barely strong enough for class III, and the Sr II is not much stronger than this would require.". E. A. Harlan published a class of K peculiar in 1969, commenting, "Hδ strong, Fe I λ4045 is weak for type". In 1990, K. Sato and S. Kuji gave a class of G8III, suggesting this is an aging G-type giant star and questioning its peculiar status. Bayesian inference of the stellar properties indicates this star is on the horizontal branch. The companion is a suspected white dwarf.

References

External links
Aladin previewer
Aladin sky atlas
 HR 563

G-type giants
Horizontal-branch stars
Spectroscopic binaries
Aries (constellation)
Arietis, Iota
Durchmusterung objects
Arietis, 08
011909
009110
0563